FC Zhenis is a Kazakhstani football club based at the K.Munaitpasov Stadium in Astana. Founding members of the Kazakhstan Premier League, they were relegated to First Division for the first time in 2009 after being declared bankrupt. The club has won the national championship on three occasions.

History
In January 2015, Astana-1964 dropped out of the Kazakhstan First Division to the regional Astana Championship.

Names
1964 : Founded as Dinamo
1975 : Renamed Tselinnik
1994 : Renamed Tsesna
1996 : Renamed Tselinnik
1997 : Renamed Astana
1999 : Renamed Zhenis
2006 : Renamed Astana
2009 : Renamed Namys
2010 : Renamed Astana
2011 : Renamed Astana-1964
2021 : Renamed Zhenis

Domestic history

Continental history
Astana-1964 has already played in qualifying stages of European cups. Last time they lost in the second qualifying round of the 2007/8 Champions League to Norway's Rosenborg after overcoming Georgian champions FC Olimpi Rustavi in the first qualifying round 3–0 on aggregate.

Stadium

Astana-1964 played their home games at the 12,350 capacity Kazhymukan Munaitpasov Stadium.

Honours
Kazakhstan Premier League: 3
2000, 2001, 2006

Kazakhstan Cup: 3
2001, 2002, 2005

Notable managers 
The following managers won at least one trophy when in charge of Astana:

See also
 Kazakhstani football clubs in European competitions

References

External links
 Official site

 
1964 establishments in the Kazakh Soviet Socialist Republic
Football clubs in Astana
Football clubs in Kazakhstan
Association football clubs established in 1964